Ajsel Kujović (Cyrillic: Ајсел Кујовић; born 1 March 1986) is a Swedish former footballer who played as a forward.

His younger brother, Emir Kujović, plays for Swedish club Djurgårdens IF

Club career
Born in Bijelo Polje, his family moved to Sweden when he was 6 years old. At the age of 8 he started to play for Klippans BoIF. In 2000, he moved to Landskrona BoIS and was signed by Dutch club Feyenoord in 2004 at the age of 18. However, in 2006 he returned home to Sweden where he signed with Halmstads BK. On 3 November 2009 Halmstas BK announced that they would not renew his contract and that he would leave the club.

For the 2011 season Kujović signed with Superettan club Landskrona BoIS, where he stayed for a season. Kujović left Landskrona and where for some time close to signe for Bulgarian club Lokomotiv Plovdiv, however this failed and Kujović was forced to look for another club, eventually signing for Swedish Division 3 club Höganäs BK.

References

External links
  
  
 

1986 births
Living people
People from Bijelo Polje
Swedish people of Bosniak descent
Swedish people of Montenegrin descent
Association football forwards
Montenegrin footballers
Swedish footballers
Sweden under-21 international footballers
Feyenoord players
Halmstads BK players
Landskrona BoIS players
Varbergs BoIS players
Åtvidabergs FF players
Allsvenskan players
Superettan players
Division 3 (Swedish football) players
Swedish expatriate footballers
Expatriate footballers in the Netherlands
Swedish expatriate sportspeople in the Netherlands